BDNI Center I was a proposed 317 m (1040 ft) skyscraper with 62 floors, intended to be constructed in the city of Jakarta in Indonesia. BDNI centre was designed by PT Airmas Asri, Pei Partnership Architects. It was designed to be the Headquarters of Bank Dagang Nasional Indonesia (BDNI)

The design was similar to that of the Bank of China Tower in Hong Kong which was also designed by I. M. Pei.

This project was cancelled due to financial difficulties which followed the 1997 Asian financial crisis and caused the collapse of BDNI bank.

External links
 
 

Buildings and structures in Jakarta
Proposed buildings and structures in Indonesia
Proposed skyscrapers
Skyscrapers in Indonesia